Truth Crushed to Earth Shall Rise Again is the third and final studio album by American hip hop group House of Pain. It was released in October 22, 1996 via Tommy Boy Records.

The album is called Truth Crushed to Earth Shall Rise Again, but the cover of the CD reads Truth Crushed To Earth Will Rise Again. The album title is a line from the poem "The Battle-Field," by William Cullen Bryant.

Critical reception
Sputnikmusic wrote that "the trio’s most rounded, consistent & memorable LP is grossly under-appreciated." Vibe wrote that the majority of DJ Lethal's beats are "surface-level and boring."

Track listing

Personnel
Erik Francis Schrody – main artist, vocals, producer, executive producer
Leor DiMant – main artist, producer, executive producer
Daniel O'Connor – main artist, vocals, artwork concept
Ross Donaldson – mixing & recording
Dave Collins – mastering
Carl Stubner – management
Mark Richardson – vocals (tracks 3–7, 12)
Otis Olivier Lyjasu Williams – vocals (track 2, 7, 12)
Derek Murphy – vocals (track 4)

Charts

References

1996 albums
House of Pain albums
Tommy Boy Records albums
Albums produced by DJ Lethal